Andrew March  is an English composer (born 1973). He was the winner of the first-ever Masterprize Composition Competition with his piece Marine — à travers les arbres. Andrew studied composition at the Royal College of Music with Jeremy Dale Roberts, graduating in 1996.

His compositions have received critical acclaim and have been performed by some of the world's most famous orchestra outfits including the London Symphony Orchestra.

Career

March was the 1996 Royal Philharmonic Society Composition prize winner.

Marine—à travers les arbres was featured at 1998's Proms, with the EUYO conducted by Vladimir Ashkenazy.

His composition "A Stirring in the Heavenlies" was recorded by the Kiev Philharmonic under composer/conductor Robert Ian Winstin for the 12–CD series "Masterworks of the New Era".

Sanguis Venenatus (2009) was an elegy written by March in memory of Haemophiliacs affected by the Tainted Blood Scandal. It was recorded by the Moravian Philharmonic with conductor Petr Vronský.

Awards
 1990 Flame of Youth Fanfare Competition (British Gas West Midlands) 
 1993 English Song Prize 
 1994 United Music Publishers' Prize
 1995 Cobbett & Hurlstone Prize
 1995 The Philip Morris Art Award (The Haemophilia Society)
 1996 Royal Philharmonic Society Composition Prize
 1996 Constant and Kit Lambert Award – (Musicians' Livery)
 1998 Masterprize International Composing Competition
 1998 Worshipful Company of Musicians Quincentenary Commission (Musicians' Livery)
 2004 International Composition Competition to Honour the Greek Poet, Pindar

Selected works

Orchestral 
 Easdale (1996)
 Marine—à travers les arbres (1997)
 Irish Reel (2000)
 A Stirring in the Heavenlies (2000), commissioned by the Worshipful Company of Musicians
 Five Songs of Pindar (2003) for soprano, choir and orchestra
 Sanguis Venenatus (2009) for string orchestra, written in memory of haemophiliacs and others who lost their lives as a result of the Tainted Blood Scandal
 Cellular Automata Orchestral Suite (2009–13)
Gosper′s Glider Gun
The Infinite Hotel
Cloverleaf Period–4 Oscillator
Babbling Brook
Pond on Pond
 Amoration (2016) for piano and strings
 Piano Concerto No. 1 (2013–19)
 The Skylark (2021) for full orchestra and SSAA voices. Text: John Clare

Ensemble 
 Flame of Youth Fanfare (1990) for brass ensemble of 12 players
 Nymphéas (1995) for 8 players
 Ten Little Pieces (1995) for 8 players
 Music for Film Credits (1996) for 9 players
 Adagio Assonnato (2000) for oboe, harp, strings
 Nymphéas for Clarinet Choir (2016)
 Elegy on Sudden Loss (2021) for string orchestra

Chamber and instrumental 
 La Maison Blanche dans les Collines (1986) for string quartet
 Cornelyn (1986)
 Images of the Lake  (1987) for solo flute
 Transient Moods  (1992) for guitar solo
 Nymphèas for Two Pianos (2001), revised (2019)
 Alto Flute and Harp Book (2001) 
 Water Lilies with Kingma System quarter–tone alto flute ossia
 XXIX—in perpetuum for solo Kingma System quarter–tone alto flute
 Adagio Assonnato 
 Aeolian Rustling with Kingma System quarter–tone alto flute ossia
 Dragonfly
 In Memoriam (2002) for Kingma System quarter–tone alto flute, marimba, vibraphone, harp and strings 
 Equipoise (2005) for bass clarinet and piano
 String Quartet Cycle "Birds of Prey'''' (2009)
 Irish Reel—Piano Transcription (2009) for piano solo
 Phoenix Trail (2010) for violin and piano
 Three Pieces for Solo Cello (2011)
 Solo Piano Album "14 pieces" (2014)
 Ephemeral Nymphs (2015) for cello and piano
 Dragonfly (2016) for flute, viola and harp
 Spring Tide Arabesque (2016) for bass clarinet duo
 Nightwind (2016) for flute, violin and cello
 Dragonfly (2017) for clarinet, bass clarinet and piano
 Seven Pieces (2017) for bass clarinet and piano
 Two Pieces (2017)  for bass clarinet duo
 Pieces for Alto Saxophone and Piano (2019–2020)
  Moonrise at Perigee (2019)
  Nightshade (2020)
  Romance (2020)
 Solitude (2020) for alto saxophone

 Songs 
 Boy in Ice (1992) for mezzo–soprano and piano.  Text: Laurie Lee
 Invasion Summer (1993) for mezzo–soprano and 6 players. Text: Laurie Lee
 Black Edge (1993) for mezzo–soprano and 8 players. Text: Laurie Lee
 Poem I from "Chamber Music" (1996) for soprano and harp. Text: James Joyce
 Un Grand Sommeil Noir (2008) for baritone and piano. Text: Paul Verlaine
 Two Lovers (2009) for baritone and piano. Text: George Eliot

 Choral 
 Be Still and Know (2000)
 O Sing Unto the Lord (2000)
 The Grace (2003)
 Magnificat (2004)
 Spiritus (2004)
 Thou Art Worthy (2004)
 Nunc Dimittis "The Song of Simeon" (2004)
 Phos Hilaron "Song of the Light" (2004)
 Marian Antiphon No.3 "Regina Caeli" (2005) 
 Marian Antiphon No.2 "Ave Regina Coelorum" (2005)
 25 Choral Collects (2006); Text: Common Worship, Additional Collects
 May We Who Share His Table (2006)
 Creator of the Heavens "Choral Collect for Epiphany" (2006) Text: Common Worship, Additional Collects
 Psalm 57 (2007) 
 Somnia (2007) Text: Petronius Arbiter; Translation: Helen Waddell 
 How Long, O Lord? (2008)
 My Voice is Unto God (2008), with organ accompaniment
 May We Who Share His Table (2009) for SSA choir with piano accompaniment
 And It Shall Be (2010)
 De Profundis (2011), for SAATBB choir
 Spera in Domino "Psalm 36" (2012)
 Dixit Iniustus "Psalm 35" (2012)
 Dies Quoque  "Day of Narrow Anguish" (2012)  
 Ante Faciem Dei (2015) 
 Your Eyes Fall Upon Us "Anthem for Remembrance" (2015); Text (adaptation): Sue Threakall
 Laudate Dominum (2015)
 Psalm 22 (2015) for SSATB choir 
 Your Mercy, O Lord (2016) for SSAA choir with piano accompaniment
 Our God at Hand (2019)
 Lament (2021) for SSAATTBB choir

Discography
 1998 – Top of the World, Marine – à travers les arbres, London Symphony Orchestra, cond. Daniel Harding (March 1998, BBC Music Magazine: BBC MM67)
 1998 – Masterprize Finalists, Marine – à travers les arbres, London Symphony Orchestra, cond. Daniel Harding (4 September 1998, EMI Debut Series: CDZ572826-2)
 2005 – Masterworks of the New Era – Volume Seven, A Stirring in the Heavenlies, Kiev Philharmonic, cond. Robert Ian Winstin (28 November 2005, ERM Media: ERM-6709)
 2007 – Masterworks of the New Era – Volume Eleven, Nymphéas, Kiev Philharmonic, cond. Robert Ian Winstin (1 September 2007, ERM Media: ERM-6811)
 2007 – Regina Caeli, Nunc Dimittis; Magnificat; Be Still and Know; Spiritus etc., The Chapel Choir of Corpus Christi College, Cambridge, cond. Daniel Soper; Rebecca Drake, (26 October 2007, Lammas Records: LAMM188D)
 2012 – Dimensions, Sanguis Venenatus, Moravian Philharmonic Strings, cond. Petr Vronský (13 November 2012, Navona Records: NV5895)
 2013 – Moto Perpetuo, Three Pieces for Solo Cello, Ovidiu Marinescu (26 March 2013, Navona Records: NV5901)
 2014 – As if to sleep, Elveden; Nosce Te Ipsum; Moonvine; Pavane; Homage; Night Vigil; Solus etc., pf. Andrew March (29 January 2014, Assonnato Records: ATO573201)
 2016 – Amoration, F.A.M.E.'S. Macedonian Radio Symphonic Orchestra, cond. Oleg Kondratenko; pf. Marija Vrskova (18 March 2016, Assonnato Records: ATO573202)
 2022 – Elegy on Sudden Loss'' (video), OpenSound Orchestra, cond. Stanislav Malyshev; (24 March 2022, Assonnato Records: ATO573203).

References

External links
 Biography, Wise Music Classical
 Da Vinci Edition
 British Music Collection (BMIC)
 Soundcloud
 Musicalics, The Classical Composers Database
 YouTube, (Sanguis Venenatus)
 British Library (Sound & Moving Image Catalogue) 
 Alliance Publications, Inc.
 St. James Music Press (SJMP), North Carolina
 Andrew March - Navona Records
 RCM Library Catalogue 

1973 births
Living people
People from Nuneaton
English composers
English classical composers
English male classical composers
People associated with the Royal College of Music
Alumni of the Royal College of Music
20th-century classical composers
21st-century classical composers
Composers for piano
Male classical composers
Classical composers of church music
Composers of Christian music
Choral composers
Composers for cello
20th-century British composers
21st-century British composers
20th-century British male musicians
21st-century British male musicians